Fura may refer to:

 Mount Fura (Mt Darwin) site of capital of Monomotapa kingdom in Zimbabwe
 Fura (food), Nigerian millet dough balls eaten with nono
 Fura (rapper), Indian rapper
 SEAT Fura supermini car produced by Spanish automaker SEAT, between 1981 and 1986, based on the Fiat 127
 La Fura dels Baus Spanish theatrical group founded in 1979 in Moià, Barcelona
 Fura-Pawa (or El Molo), a possibly extinct language belonging to the Cushitic branch of the Afro-Asiatic family
 Nigist Fura, a legendary Queen of Ethiopia

Science
 Fura-2, an aminopolycarboxylic acid
 Fura-2-acetoxymethyl ester, membrane-permeable derivative of the ratiometric calcium indicator Fura-2

Acronyms
Puerto Rico Joint Forces of Rapid Action Spanish: Fuerzas Unidas de Rapida Acción (FURA)
Frente Unido de Reforma Agraria (FURA) coalition of popular movements in Ecuador, formed in 1972 for land reform